Daniel Marsin (born November 13, 1951 in Pointe-à-Pitre, Guadeloupe) is a member of the Senate of France, representing the island of Guadeloupe.  He is locally a member of Guadeloupe unie, socialisme et réalités, and at the national level of the Modern Left, a satellite organisation of Nicolas Sarkozy' Union for a Popular Movement. He is a member of the parliamentary group European Democratic and Social Rally in the French Senate.

References
Page on the French Senate website

1951 births
Living people
People from Pointe-à-Pitre
Guadeloupean politicians
Modern Left politicians
Deputies of the 11th National Assembly of the French Fifth Republic
French Senators of the Fifth Republic
Senators of Guadeloupe